Maya Delilah (born 5 May 2000) is an English singer-songwriter and guitarist.

Biography
She was born and raised in Islington, London. When she was 15, she was a finalist in The Mayor of London’s Gigs Big Busk, the UK's biggest annual street music competition. She attended the BRIT school. As of January 2023, she has well over 500,000 monthly listeners on Spotify.

Her style has been described as a "unique blend of jazz, soul, and pop", and she has listed "Anderson. Paak, Tyler The Creator, John Mayer, [and] Derek Trucks" as musical influences.

Discography

EPs
2020 - Oh Boy
2021 - It's Not Me, It's You

References

2000 births
Living people
English singer-songwriters